Paul Hervey Fox (March 13, 1894  November 1, 1954) was an American playwright, novelist, and screenwriter. He wrote several films during the pre-Code era and Hollywood golden age, including Mandalay (1934), Grand Finale (1936), The Last Train from Madrid (1937), Safari (1940), A Gentleman at Heart (1942), and The Stars Are Singing (1953). He also published several novels and short stories, and wrote five Broadway plays.

He was the father of author Paula Fox, whose mother was Cuban writer Elsie Fox (née de Sola). He is the biological grandfather of Linda Carroll, and great-grandfather of her daughter, rock musician Courtney Love.

Life and career
Fox was born in New York City in 1894 to Winfield Douglas Fox and Mary Finch. Fox's paternal great-grandmother, Jane, immigrated to the United States from her native Nova Scotia, Canada. He was the cousin of writer Faith Baldwin and actor Douglas Fairbanks. Fox was raised in Yonkers, New York, and was "thrown out of three [different] colleges." At age nineteen, Fox sold his first story to The Smart Set, a New York-based literary magazine.

Fox married Cuban writer Elsie de Sola in 1923, and they had a daughter, Paula Fox, born the same year. Elsie initially gave their daughter to a foundling hospital, but reclaimed her shortly after. Paula was largely raised by relatives and friends in the United States and Cuba, until around age seven, when she briefly lived with Paul and Elsie in Los Angeles, where the couple had relocated to pursue screenwriting in Hollywood. Paula recalled that her father was a "far-gone alcoholic, bent on placating Elsie and just about everybody else," though she stated he was "charming and almost affectionate." Paula would later refer to her mother as a "sociopath." In 1944, Paula gave birth to a daughter, Linda Carroll, whom she gave up for adoption. Carroll is a therapist and the mother of musician Courtney Love ( 1964).

In 1925, Fox's play Odd Man Out premiered on Broadway. Between then and 1938, four more of his plays were performed in Broadway theaters, though he later joked: "My plays dimmed more Broadway stars and killed more good performers than there are in the Actors Home." 

In 1928, Fox wrote the short story The Strange Case of Dr. Fell, which was published in a serialized form in Ghost Stories in four parts. Fox's play Soldiers and Women, which was staged on Broadway and ran for just under one year, led to him receiving a screenwriting job offer in California. He accepted the position, and relocated with wife Elsie to Los Angeles, where he quickly developed a drinking problem. Soldiers and Women was adapted into a feature film of the same name in 1930.

Fox's 1929 story Housebroken was adapted into a film of the same name in 1936. Fox wrote the story of the 1937 film The Last Train from Madrid with his then-wife, Elsie. Fox later told his daughter, Paula, that he had written the film "in a week, while Elsie...  handed him Benzedrine tablets from the bed upon which she lay, doing crossword puzzles and lighting cigarette after cigarette." Fox was paid $10,000 for the story. Upon release, the film was lambasted by writer Graham Greene, who publicly deemed it "the worst movie I ever saw."

In 1935, Fox published the novel Sailor Town, which earned high praise, and was deemed by one unnamed English critic as "one of the best six novels to appear in the English language" that year. This was followed by The Antagonists, which followed a self-indulgent mathematics professor. In reviewing The Antagonists, critic E. E. Hollis of The Salt Lake Tribune noted Fox as a "distinctive talent" and praised the work.

In 1946, Fox published his third novel, Four Men. By this time, Fox had become disillusioned by his writing career in Hollywood, and left Los Angeles to return to the east coast. After divorcing Elsie, he later remarried to a woman named Mary, with whom he had three other children.

Death
Fox died in Swarthmore, Pennsylvania on November 1, 1954, aged 60.

Filmography

Bibliography
Novels
 Sailor Town (1935, Henry Holt Publishing)
 The Antagonists (1937, Henry Holt Publishing)
 Four Men (1946, Charles Scribner's Sons)
 The Daughter of Jairus (1951, Little, Brown)

Plays
Odd Man Out (1925; Broadway)
Soldiers and Women (1929; Broadway)
The Great Man (1931; Broadway)
Foreign Affairs (1932; Broadway)
If I Were You (1938; Broadway)

Short stories
 The Strange Case of Doctor Fell (1928, serialized in Ghost Stories)

References

Sources

External links

1894 births
1954 deaths
American male dramatists and playwrights
American male novelists
American male screenwriters
American male short story writers
American people of Canadian descent
Deaths in Pennsylvania
People from Yonkers, New York
Writers from New York City
20th-century American dramatists and playwrights